HMS Norwich was a 50-gun fourth rate ship of the line of the English Royal Navy, launched at Portsmouth Dockyard in 1691.

Norwich was wrecked in 1692.

Notes

References

Lavery, Brian (2003) The Ship of the Line - Volume 1: The development of the battlefleet 1650-1850. Conway Maritime Press. .

Ships of the line of the Royal Navy
1690s ships